Runway is a 2010 Bangladeshi drama film directed by Tareque Masud with his wife Catherine Masud. It was his last feature film.

Plot
Ruhul, a young, frustrated boy, lives in a small hut near an international airport. The story deals with Islamic extremism in Bangladesh.

Production 
The lyrics of the songs in the movie were written by Tareque Masud.

Cast
 Fazlul Haque as Ruhul
 Rabeya Akter Moni as Rahima
 Ali Ahsan as Arif
 Nazmul Huda Bachchu as Ruhul's Grandfather
 Nasrin Akter as Fatema
 Rikita Nandini Shimu as Sheuli
 Nurul Islam Bablu as Urdu Vai
 Jayanta Chattopadhyay as Ruhul's Uncle
 Nusrat Imroz Tisha as Selina

References

External links

 

2010 films
2010 drama films
Bengali-language Bangladeshi films
Bangladeshi drama films
Films directed by Tareque Masud
Films directed by Catherine Masud
2010s Bengali-language films
Best Film Bachsas Award winners